8Turn (stylized in all caps) is a South Korean boy band formed by MNH Entertainment. The group currently consists of eight members: Myungho, Jaeyun, Minho, Yoonsung, Haemin, Kyungmin, Yungyu and Seungheon. The group made their official debut on January 30, 2023, with the release of their first mini album 8Turnrise.

History

Pre-debut
Jaeyun was a contestant on Mnet's survival show Boys24 under the name Alex Moon. However, he was eliminated in episode 8. He later joined Liveworks Company and participated in the JTBC's survival reality series Mix Nine. He was eliminated in episode 10 after ranking 50th place.

Kyungmin was a contestant on Mnet's survival show I-Land. He was eliminated in the first part of the show.

2023–present: Debut
On January 2, 2023, MNH Entertainment announced the official debut of their first boy group by posting a logo motion video along with the opening of the official social media account of '8Turn'. The next day, 8Turn announced the release of their first extended play, 8Turnrise. It was released digitally on January 30, 2023 and physically on February 6, 2023.

Members
 Myungho 
 Jaeyun  – leader
 Minho 
 Yoonsung 
 Haemin 
 Kyungmin 
 Yungyu 
 Seungheon

Discography

Extended plays

Singles

Other charted songs

Singles

Videography

Music videos

Notes

References

2023 establishments in South Korea
K-pop music groups
Musical groups established in 2023
Musical groups from Seoul
South Korean boy bands
South Korean dance music groups
South Korean pop music groups